Interstate 77 (I-77) in the US state of Virginia is a  north–south Interstate Highway serving Hillsville, Wytheville, and Bland. Running parallel to US Route 52 (US 52), I-77 passes through the Big Walker Mountain Tunnel and East River Mountain Tunnel, the latter on the West Virginia state line and one of only two land vehicular tunnels to cross a state line.

Route description
I-77 enters Virginia near Mount Airy, North Carolina, while the highway continues south into North Carolina concurrently with a segment of the unfinished I-74. The first exit is a folded diamond interchange with State Route 620 (SR 620). The route continues northeast toward Fancy Gap and passes under the Blue Ridge Parkway, with access to it and the town provided by a diamond interchange with SR 775, which has a connection to US 52. 

Continuing northwest, the expressway reaches another diamond interchange with US 58/US 221 (Carrollton Pike). The route has another interchange with SR 620 before folding onto I-81.

The route begins a wrong-way concurrency with I-81 and US 11, with the northbound direction cosigned with southbound I-81 and US 11. US 52 joins this concurrency in an interchange. Continuing west, US 11 splits south to Wytheville's downtown and I-81 eventually splits west to head toward Bristol. From here, US 52 resumes its parallel of the expressway and the highway intersects SR 61 near Rocky Gap. US 52 merges onto the freeway on the approach to the East River Mountain Tunnel, and the tunnel crosses into West Virginia, where the route continues.

History
I-77 was first opened in 1972 between I-81 in Wytheville and US 52 in Bland, which also included the Big Walker Mountain Tunnel. The Interstate was extended from Bland to the West Virginia border in 1974–1975; this extension included the East River Mountain Tunnel. In July 1977, I-77 was built between the North Carolina border and Fancy Gap, and, in December, it was extended from Fancy Gap to Poplar Camp. In 1978, I-77 was built between Poplar Camp and I-81. The Interstate existed in two separate segments until 1987, when the I-81/I-77 overlap between Wytheville and Fort Chiswell was built.

I-77 in Fancy Gap has been the site of many fatal accidents, often due to fog and wind in the mountains. In November 2010, two people died as a result of a 75-vehicle pileup. On March 31, 2013, 17 crashes along I-77 led to a 95-vehicle pileup and resulted in three deaths. In September 2013, a pileup resulted in one death.

Exit list

References

External links

77
Interstate 077
Interstate 077
Interstate 077
 Virginia